Abdollahabad (also Romanized as ‘Abdollahābād; also known as ‘Abdolābād) is a village in Robat-e Jaz Rural District, in the Central District of Khoshab County, Razavi Khorasan Province, Iran. At the 2006 census, its population was 175, in 40 families.

See also 

 List of cities, towns and villages in Razavi Khorasan Province

References 

Populated places in Khoshab County